Ronnie Neal Sutton (born June 17, 1941) is a former Democratic member of the North Carolina General Assembly who represented the state's forty-seventh House district, including constituents in Hoke and Robeson counties.  An attorney from Pembroke, North Carolina, Sutton served nine terms in the state house (1993-2011). He is a member of the Lumbee Tribe of North Carolina.

Recent electoral history

2010

2008

2006

2004

2002

2000

References

|-

Democratic Party members of the North Carolina House of Representatives
Living people
1941 births
20th-century American politicians
20th-century Native Americans
21st-century American politicians
21st-century Native Americans
Lumbee people